Lakshmi temple (Devanagari: लक्ष्मी मंदिर) is dedicated to Goddess Lakshmi, consort of Lord Vishnu.

This structure is one of the monument among Khajuraho Group of Monuments, a World Heritage Site in India.

Location
The temple is located in the Western Group of Temple Complex Khajuraho. Inside the temple complex, it is located north to Varaha Temple and opposite Lakshaman Temple.

Khajuraho is a small village in Chattarpur District of Madhya Pradesh, India.

Architecture 
Temple structure rests on square shaped modest (chabutara). It has small sanctum.

The side and back walls do not have any sculptures.

References

External links 
 M.P. Tourism Website, Official Website of Madhya Pradesh State Tourism Corporation, Khajuraho
 Archaeological Survey of India, Bhopal Division, Index Page for Khajuraho - Chhatarpur 

Bundelkhand
Monuments and memorials in Madhya Pradesh
World Heritage Sites in India
Hindu temples in Khajuraho
Lakshmi temples